Brave New Voices  was created by Youth Speaks Inc  in 1998 (a non-profit organization from San Francisco promoting youth intellectual and artistic self-development) after the inaugural Youth Speaks Teen slam poetry in San Francisco – the first poetry slam dedicated to youth in the world.  Since that time, Brave New Voices has grown to represent youth ages 13–19 from all across the United States and several cities and countries from around the world.  BNV is the largest ongoing spoken word event in the world. Cities compose teams of their top 4-6 youth poets to bring to the festival. When the festival began only four teams participated, and the competition has since grown to more than 50 teams.

The final contestants are judged by a jury composed of artistic personalities. In 2010, the jury was composed by the illusionist and TV host Penn Jillette, poets Mayda Del Valle and Beau Sia, musician Talib Kweli and actress Sanaa Lathan.

The finale of Brave New Voices in 2008 and 2010 was aired on HBO.

HBO Presents Brave New Voices 
James Kass, Marc Bamuthi Joseph and others had worked with Stan Lathan for several years to make sure that young people were booked on HBO's Def Poetry. Before Russell Simmons and Lathan launched Def Poetry Jam on Broadway, they tried it out in San Francisco, finding appreciative audiences and new talents there. Kass, Bamuthi and others pitched the idea of the Brave New Voices series to Hollywood, and Lathan agreed to make it happen. He brought it to HBO, where the young poets could create without fear of censors.

Brave New Voices works to increase the visibility of youth voices, giving them a national platform on a network that will not censor or stereotype them. It also promotes the work of Youth Speaks and the youth spoken word movement as a whole. The hope is that the show will generate the attention and resources needed to sustain the work both locally in the San Francisco Bay area and nationally.

Youth Speaks had worked with HBO's Def Poetry for a few years, but the 2008 docu-series was the first direct relationship with HBO. The network provided some corporate support of the 2008 and 2010 Brave New Voices Festival. The TV series has three main partners – Youth Speaks, Simmons-Lathan Media Group, and HBO.

The Brave New Voices International Youth Poetry Slam Festival 
Brave New Voices is a program of Youth Speaks in San Francisco.  The Pedagogy of Brave New Voices was designed by Hodari Davis, who along with Joan Osato produced the festival for over a decade.  The Festival is currently produced by alumni of the BNV community every year in a different city around the United States.

The Primary activity of the Brave New Voices Festival is the International Youth Poetry Slam. The festival has happened annually since 1997, and started as a 2-3 day experience for 5 teams.  Since then it has grown to an annual competition featuring as many as 50 teams from around the United States and several places over seas.  The Brave New Voices Festival has been held in San Francisco, New York City, Washington DC, Los Angeles, Houston, San Jose, Chicago, Las Vegas, Philadelphia, Oakland, and Atlanta over the past 15 years.

The International Youth Poetry Slam 
This series requires 45 separate events to reduce 50 BNV teams from cities all over the country and around the world to 1.  The process includes two Quarter Final rounds featuring every registered team, and four Semi Final rounds featuring the top 20 teams from the Quarters.  The winner of each of the Semi Finals is a team that is featured in the Finals.  All of the Slams are 4 rounds often featuring one speed round, group and individual poems.  Slams are judged by 5 members from the community of the host city. These judges are often BNV partner affiliates, civic leaders, teachers, poets, celebrities, and other local volunteers.  The Semi Finals have been held in many prestigious venues around the United States including Constitution Hall, The Kennedy Center for the Performing Arts, At the University of Chicago.  The Finals have had audiences well over 2000 people, and have been held in additional historic venues like the Apollo Theater, The San Francisco Opera House, The Chicago Theater, and other places around the country.
  
During the Brave New Voices festival smaller, specific competitions and events have been held that are open to all participants in the larger festival. There are many different types of competitions and events including: Speak Green, The BNV MC Olympics, the Individual Poetry Slam, Queeriosity, Life is Living, and others. Winners of these competitions and stand out performers from these events are often highlighted during the festival, featured in social media and on YouTube, and given other performance opportunities outside of the festival.

Speak Green 
From 2007 - 2012, Speak Green was a competition where participants write and perform poems about the environment and environmental justice. This was a product of collaboration between Youth Speaks and the Robert Redford Sundance Institute. The top poets from this competition then formed the Green Team. Past members of the Green Team were able to perform at the Sundance Film Festival, the US Green Build conference and the Kennedy Center James Redford, son of Robert Redford who was a sponsor of Speak Green, has spoken publicly about the Green Team's efforts: "Artists like the Green Team poets have the power to remind us of the power of our own humanity. By taking something as broad as climate change, and running it through the prism of personal experience and artistic expression, well, what emerges are stories of undeniable honesty and power, stories that can inspire commitments to action, solutions, and change."

MC Olympics 
In 2009, BNV introduced an event inspired by the work of Young Chicago Authors.  BNV established a National MC Olympics competition "as a model to engage rappers in the poet community". The competition is open to all participants of Brave New Voices and each phase of the competition focuses on a certain style or technique of rapping such as freestyling and written verses. The winner of the competition each year is awarded a champion trophy.

Life is Living 
In 2009 BNV Introduced an annual service project aimed at making a lasting contribution to the cities that we visit.  The BNV Life is Living Experience featured community activism, street parades, gardening, live performances, and celebration deep in the urban centers of the cities we visited.  For 9 years we were able to provide 600 to 800 hands in service to beautifying community, and experience feature performances from many brilliant artists including Saul Williams, Pharaoh Monche, Mic Jenkins, George Watsky, Chinaka Hodge, Jamila Woods, Theaster Gates and many others.  www.lifeisliving.org

Queeriosity 
In 2010 BNV Introduced an event inspired by the work of Youth Speaks in the Bay Area.  BNV established a National Queeriosity event that features LGBTQ youth, coaches and celebrity poets in a high level open mic.  This event is often highlighted by special performances from members of the Brave New Voices community that often prove to be among the best and most memorable of the entire festival.  This highly attended event is usually a standing room only experience.

Team Finalists

MC Olympic Champions

Individual Poetry Slam Champion

References

External links 
 
 Brave New Voices on HBO

Slam poetry
American poetry
Spoken word contests